The 1936 Philadelphia Eagles season was their fourth in the league. The team failed to improve on their previous output of 2–9, winning only one game. Being shut out in six of their twelve games, the team failed to qualify for the playoffs for the fourth consecutive season.

Offseason
 The Eagles moved their training camp, after the first 2 years in Atlantic City, New Jersey and last year in Philadelphia at the Chestnut Hill Academy, to Temple University in Philadelphia. The Eagles would place 7 former Temple Owls on the team
 Eagles would move games to larger Philadelphia Municipal Stadium.
Bert Bell convinced the league to hold a college players draft to stock league with talent.

NFL Draft
The 1936 NFL Draft was held in Philadelphia and The Eagles had the first pick. Jay Berwanger a Halfback from the University of Chicago was selected. He selected not to play in the NFL. Later in year he was traded to the Chicago Bears and still refused to play NFL football.

Player selections
The table shows the Eagles selections and what picks they had that were traded away and the team that ended up with that pick It is possible the Eagles' pick ended up with this team via another team that the Eagles made a trade with. 
Not shown are acquired picks that the Eagles traded away.

Regular season

Schedule

Standings

Roster
(All time List of Philadelphia Eagles players in franchise history)

The Eagles had 12 rookies and 8 players with 2 years experience or less on their roster. Eleven of the 26 members on the team went to school within 15 miles of Philadelphia.

References

Philadelphia Eagles seasons
Philadelphia Eagles
Philadelphia Eag